Visa requirements for Malaysian citizens are administrative entry restrictions by the authorities of other states placed on citizens of Malaysia. As of January 2023, Malaysian citizens had visa-free or visa on arrival access to 180 countries and territories, ranking the Malaysian passport 14th in the world according to the Henley Passport Index, making it the 2nd highest-ranked passport in Southeast Asia after Singapore, the 4th highest-ranked in Asia and the highest-ranked passport in the developing world and among Muslim-majority countries.

Although Malaysian passports bear the inscription "This passport is valid for all countries except Israel" and the Malaysian government officially allows travel to Israel for Christian pilgrims only, the travel restrictions imposed by the Malaysian government have no bearing on the Israeli government, which issues visas to Malaysian citizens according to Israeli regulations.

In September 2017,  Malaysia announced a ban on all Malaysian citizens from travelling to North Korea, in the wake of strained Malaysia–North Korea relations following the assassination of Kim Jong-nam at Kuala Lumpur International Airport.

Visa requirements map for Malaysian citizens

Visa requirements

Territories and disputed areas
Visa requirements for Malaysia citizens for visits to various territories, disputed areas, partially recognized countries and restricted zones:

APEC Business Travel Card

Holders of an APEC Business Travel Card (ABTC)  travelling on business do not require a visa to the following countries:

1 – up to 90 days
2 – up to 60 days
3 – up to 59 days

The card must be used in conjunction with a passport and has the following advantages:
undertake legitimate business in participating economies
expedited border crossing in all member economies, including transitional members
expedited scheduling of visa interview (United States)

Non-visa restrictions

See also

 Visa policy of Malaysia
 Malaysian passport

References and Notes
References

Notes

Malaysia
Foreign relations of Malaysia
Malaysian nationality law